Reference Re Alberta Statutes, also known as the Alberta Press case and the Alberta Press Act Reference, is a landmark reference of the Supreme Court of Canada where several provincial laws, including one restricting the press, were struck down and the existence of an implied bill of rights protecting civil liberties such as a free press was first proposed.

Background

The province of Alberta, under the Social Credit government of William Aberhart had passed several laws as part of a series of reforms inspired by social credit economic theory.  Arising from the 1937 Social Credit backbenchers' revolt, the Legislative Assembly of Alberta passed several Acts to implement the Social Credit agenda, to which royal assent was given:

 Credit of Alberta Regulation Act (requiring all bankers to obtain a license from the Social Credit Commission)
 Bank Employees Civil Rights Act (preventing unlicensed banks and their employees from initiating civil actions)
 Judicature Act Amendment Act (preventing any person from challenging the constitutionality of Alberta's laws in court without receiving the approval of the Lieutenant-Governor in Council)

In August 1937, the federal government disallowed all three Acts. The Supreme Court of Canada, in answering reference questions posed by the federal government, unanimously ruled that such disallowance was valid.

Following the disallowance, the Alberta legislature passed the following bills in October 1937:

 Bill No. 1 Bank Taxation Act (levying provincial taxes on banks' paid-up capital and reserve funds at punitive rates)
 Bill No. 8 Credit of Alberta Regulation Act, 1937 (similar to the previous disallowed Act, but covering all "credit institutions")
 Bill No. 9 Accurate News and Information Act (requiring newspapers to print "clarifications" of stories considered inaccurate by the Social Credit Board, and to reveal their sources on demand, and also authorizing the provincial government to prohibit the publication of any newspaper, any article by a given writer, or any article making use of a given source)

All bills were reserved by Lieutenant-Governor John C. Bowen. As a result, the federal government posed reference questions to the Supreme Court as to whether it was intra vires the provincial legislature to pass any of those measures.

Reference to the Supreme Court of Canada
All six members of the Court declared the subject matter of all the bills as ultra vires the province. In addition, the Court ruled 5-0 (Cannon J expressing no opinion) that the Alberta Social Credit Act was unconstitutional as well, as it attempted to intrude on the federal powers relating to currency, banks and banking, and trade and commerce.

As to the  Accurate News and Information Act, five of the six justices stated that, since the press bill was ancillary to the Alberta Social Credit Act which had been ruled ultra vires, the press bill was automatically as well, while Cannon J considered the subject matter of the bill to be solely under federal jurisdiction. In their concurring opinion for the majority, Duff CJ and Davis J argued that press freedom was too important to be left entirely to the provinces. The three judges argued that the preamble of the British North America Act, 1867, which states that Canada has a constitution similar to that of the United Kingdom, implies that freedom of the press is vital to Canada's democratic system.

Appeal to the Privy Council
The Board declared that, as the Alberta Social Credit Act had been subsequently repealed by the Alberta legislature, Bills 8 and 9 could not be brought into operation, as their provisions were contingent on actions of the now-abolished Social Credit Board. Therefore, the question was moot, and they expressed no opinion on them.

As to Bill 1, the Board agreed with the opinion of Kerwin J (concurred in by Crocket J) that:

Accordingly, the bill was in pith and substance a measure to regulate banking, and was thus ultra vires the province.

Significance

The SCC ruling was one of the foundation cases leading to the recognition of an Implied Bill of Rights in Canadian constitutional law.

References

Supreme Court of Canada cases
Judicial Committee of the Privy Council cases on appeal from Canada
Canadian freedom of expression case law
Alberta case law
Canadian federalism case law
Political history of Alberta
1938 in Canadian case law
Supreme Court of Canada reference question cases
Social credit
Banking case law in Canada
Media case law
Monarchy in Canada